Paul Mérault Monneron or de Monneron (23 February 1748, Annonay, Ardèche – May 1788, Vanikoro) was an engineer officer in the French armed forces and from 1785 to 1788 a member of Lapérouse's expedition.

Family 

His eldest brother Charles Claude Ange Monneron was député to the Estates General of 1789, for the Sénéchaussée of Annonay, his brothers Louis Monneron (1742–1805) and Pierre Antoine Monneron (1747–1801) were respectively députés of the National Constituent Assembly for the West Indies and Mauritius. Another brother, Joseph François Augustin Monneron (1756–1826) was député for Paris at the Legislative Assembly and retired from it in 1792, before becoming Director General of the Caisse des Comptes Courants and going bankrupt in 1798.

Life 

Entering the École du génie de Mézières and received as an engineer on 1 January 1770, he was first employed in France, at Briançon then Saint-Omer.

Participation in Lapérouse's expedition 

Lapérouse proposed Monneron to Fleurieu as the expedition's chief engineer, for "such a character joined to knowledge is that which convened in him".

Moneron Island, discovered by the expedition west of Sakhalin Island, was named after him.

He died in the shipwreck of the Astrolabe at Vanikoro in 1788.

See also
 European and American voyages of scientific exploration

Notes

Sources 
 His genealogy on geneanet samlap

Bibliography
 L'expédition de Lapérouse 1785–1788 Réplique Française aux voyages de Cook – C.Gaziello Paris 1984

External links 
 Association Lapérouse France

1748 births
1788 deaths
People from Annonay
French engineers
French explorers